Maryse Alberti (born March 10, 1954) is a French cinematographer who mainly works in the United States on independent fiction films and vérité, observational documentaries.  Alberti has won awards from the Sundance Film Festival and the Spirit Awards. She was the first contemporary female cinematographer featured on the cover of American Cinematographer for her work on Todd Haynes' Velvet Goldmine.

Early life
Alberti was born in Langon, France. At the age of 19 in 1973, Alberti traveled to New York City planning to see Jimi Hendrix in concert, but only discovered of his death after her arrival. Instead of returning to France, she hitchhiked around the US for three years before she settled in New York City. There, she began a job as an au pair before turning to film.

Career
In a podcast interview with Movie Geeks United!, Alberti states that she never attended film school.  She first landed in the film industry as a still photographer for porn films.  In 1982, after having worked on enough film sets and getting to know people within the industry, she persuaded the filmmakers of the small punk film-noir film Vortex (1982)  to let her be an assistant to the cinematographer.  At the time, she had known nothing about film-making and was trained by the film's cinematographer, Steven Fierberg.  

Alberti began her cinematography career working for the film company, Apparatus, run by short-film director Christine Vachon. The first full-length documentary she shot was Stephanie Black's H-2 Worker (1990). She won her first Sundance Film Festival award as a cinematographer for this film.  She secured her career after being hired for Todd Haynes' controversial pseudo-documentary feature film Poison (1991).  

The cinematographer is most famous for shooting both feature films and small 16mm documentaries- her favourite camera being an Aaton 16 mm camera.  She has voiced that her favourite genre of film is documentary because she finds there is "always an adventure [and] a lesson" with this medium and she enjoys learning how to use simple tools and work with small groups of people. 

Alberti's first big budget film was Haynes' Velvet Goldmine (1998) with a spending allowance of $8 million. Working on this film also consisted of her first time having to use a camera operator. 

In June 2006, Alberti traveled to Germany to film portions of the FIFA World Cup for scenes to be shown in Michael Apted's soccer documentary The Power of the Game (2007). 

A more recent work includes Darren Aronofsky's wrestling drama, The Wrestler (2008), starring Mickey Rourke.  Aronofsky hired Alberti as the cinematographer due to her documentary background. Prior to working on this film, Alberti had no knowledge or experience with wrestling so she would study the sport by attending wrestling matches with members of the crew every Saturday night for a period of time. She revealed that viewing the sport in person was helpful to see the world of wrestling. The director and her decided on a "naturalist look"; her aim was to "make [the film style] work for the drama of the film and keep it as natural as possible" in order to let the viewer feel like they were in a "real [wrestling] place".  Important film elements, styles, and techniques were decided between Alberti and the director including an aspect ratio of 2.4:1 in order to capture the wrestling ring, fans, and the arena which they decided were very valuable to the sport. Alberti also used a handheld camera for the action scenes and shot in 16mm film to, as she states in an interview with MovieMaker, "[embrace] a slightly grainy, edgier look". She used the Arriflex 416 camera and Kodak Vision3 500T color negative film 7219. 

In 2013, her photography series called The Pool Series was featured in the gallery 'Show Room' located in Brooklyn, New York. Alberti has stated that she could not see what she was photographing and could "only anticipate what the next fragment of time might look like" and thus aimed to create an "artistic anticipation".

On being a woman in a male-dominated field 
Alberti has discussed that being a woman in a field of work that mainly consists of men has not hindered her career and success. In an interview with the Los Angeles Times, she mentions that in the beginning of her career crew members would tease her for being a petite woman working a physically demanding job. In response, she would reply with "The little lady doesn't carry the big lights. She points and the big guys carry the lights".

Filmography

Feature films

Documentaries

Awards and nominations
 1990 Sundance Film Festival Excellence in Cinematography Award Documentary - H-2 Worker (1990) 
 1995 Sundance Film Festival Excellence in Cinematography Award Documentary- Crumb (1994) 
 1999 Independent Spirit Award Best Cinematography- Velvet Goldmine (1998) 
 2004 Independent Spirit Award- We Don't Live Here Anymore (2004) 
 2006 Women in Film Crystal + Lucy Awards Kodak Vision Award 
 2006 Primetime Emmy Award nomination for Cinematography for Nonfiction Programming (Single Camera)-  All Aboard! Rosie's Family Cruise (2006) 
 2009 Independent Spirit Award Best Cinematography- The Wrestler (2008)

References

External links
 Making the Wrestler Real at Moving Image Source

1954 births
Living people
French cinematographers
French women cinematographers
French expatriates in the United States
People from Langon, Gironde